Alghur (also Romanized as Alghūr; also known as Alqūr, Qara Angūr, and Qareh Angūr) is a village in Sefid Sang Rural District, Qalandarabad District, Fariman County, Razavi Khorasan Province, Iran. At the 2006 census, its population was 206, in 40 families.

References 

Populated places in Fariman County